The 2005–06 Boston College Eagles men's basketball team played college basketball for the Boston College Eagles as a member of the Atlantic Coast Conference during the 2005–06 NCAA Division I men's basketball season. Led by head coach Al Skinner, the team played their home games at the Conte Forum in Chestnut Hill, Massachusetts. After finishing third in the ACC regular season standings, the Eagles reached the finals of the ACC Tournament before losing to Duke. The team received an at-large bid to the NCAA tournament as the No. 4 seed in the Midwest region. BC defeated  and Montana to reach the Sweet Sixteen where they were beaten by No. 1 seed Villanova 60–59 in overtime. The team finished with an overall record of 28–8 (11–5 ACC).

Roster

Schedule and results

|-
!colspan=9 style=| Regular season

|-
!colspan=9 style=| ACC Tournament

|-
!colspan=9 style=| NCAA Tournament

Rankings

References

Boston College Eagles men's basketball seasons
Boston College
Boston College
Boston College Eagles men's basketball
Boston College Eagles men's basketball
Boston College Eagles men's basketball
Boston College Eagles men's basketball